The 1991 Oregon Ducks football team represented the University of Oregon during the 1991 NCAA Division I-A football season. They were led by head coach Rich Brooks, who was in his 15th season as head coach of the Ducks. They played their home games at Autzen Stadium in Eugene, Oregon and participated as members of the Pacific-10 Conference.

Schedule

Personnel

Season summary

Oregon

References

Oregon
Oregon Ducks football seasons
Oregon Ducks football